Tim Mountford (born April 2, 1946) is a former American cyclist. He competed at the 1964 Summer Olympics and the 1968 Summer Olympics.

References

External links
 

1946 births
Living people
American male cyclists
Olympic cyclists of the United States
Cyclists at the 1964 Summer Olympics
Cyclists at the 1968 Summer Olympics
Cyclists from Los Angeles